This is a list of notable Chinese sauces, encompassing sauces that originated in China or are widely used as cooking ingredients or condiments in Chinese cuisines.

Chinese sauces

These sauces are commonly used as ingredients for dishes in many Chinese cuisines. There may also be regional variations on the sauces, such as seasoned soy sauce or fermented bean curd.
 Light soy sauce – a lighter-colored salty-flavored sauce used for seasoning and not as a dipping sauce
Dark soy sauce – a darker-colored sauce used for color
Seasoned soy sauce – usually light soy sauce seasoned with herbs, spices, sugar, or other sauces
Sweet bean sauce – a thick savory paste
Oyster sauce
Fermented bean curd – usually cubes of tofu, and sometimes other spices and seasonings, which are used as a condiment or marinade along with some of the brine
Douchi – fermented black beans, usually in a brine
Cooking wine
Sesame oil
Black vinegar
White vinegar

Cantonese cuisine 
 Haixian sauce (Cantonese: Hoisin)
 XO sauce – a spicy seafood sauce that originated from Hong Kong. It is commonly used in Cantonese cuisine

 Shao Kao sauce (Cantonese: Siu Haau) – a thick, savory, slightly spicy BBQ sauce generally known as the primary barbecue sauce used within Chinese and Cantonese cuisine.
 Shacha sauce – A sauce or paste that is used as a base for soups, hotpot, as a rub, stir fry seasoning and as a component for dipping sauces.
Cha Shao sauce (Cantonese: Char Siu)
 Plum sauce
Fish sauce

Hunan cuisine 

 Duo Jiao – chopped chilis pickled in a sour brine
 Yongfeng chili sauce - finely chopped chilis that are mixed with flour and bean powder and fermented

Guizhou cuisine 

 Ci Ba La
 Zao La
Lao Guo La (Lao Gan Ma is a brand of Guizhou Lao Guo La chili sauces.)

Jiangsu cuisine 

 Rib sauce

Northern Chinese cuisines 
Sesame Paste
 Soy bean Paste / Yellow bean paste

Sichuan cuisine 
 Doubanjiang – a mix of fermented beans, chilis, salt, and flour used for flavor and color
 Chili oil – usually made by pouring hot oil that's been seasoned with spices onto ground chili flakes and left to steep

Notable exceptions 
While Doubanjiang can be considered the "mother sauce" of Sichuan cuisine, there are some prominent flavors in modern Sichuan cooking that are often referenced as sauces but are composed of other ingredients and sauces during cooking. These include:

 Yuxiang
 Mala
 Guaiwei

Taiwanese cuisine 

 Soy sauce paste

See also

 Chinese pickles
 List of Chinese desserts
 List of Chinese dishes
 List of Chinese soups
 List of sauces

References

 
Sauces
Chinese